22nd parallel may refer to:

22nd parallel north, a circle of latitude in the Northern Hemisphere
22nd parallel south, a circle of latitude in the Southern Hemisphere